Jean Meslier (also Mellier; 15 June 1664 – 17 June 1729) was a French Catholic priest (abbé) who was discovered, upon his death, to have written a book-length philosophical essay promoting atheism and materialism. Described by the author as his "testament" to his parishioners, the text criticizes and denounces all religions.

Life

Jean Meslier was born in Mazerny in the Ardennes. He began learning Latin from a neighbourhood priest in 1678 and eventually joined the seminary; he later claimed, in the Author's Preface to his Testament, this was done to please his parents. At the end of his studies, he took Holy orders and, on 7 January 1689, became priest at Étrépigny, in Champagne.

One public disagreement with a local nobleman aside, Meslier was to all appearances generally unremarkable. However, he was twice reproved by clerical authorities for inappropriately employing young adult servant women, with whom the atheist and Meslier biographer Michel Onfray suggests he was sexually involved.  "Discreetly and secretly, the curé had to practice the joy of free love advocated in his work," writes Onfray. He lived like a pauper, and every penny left over was donated to the poor.

When Meslier died in Étrépigny, there were found in his house three copies of a 633-page octavo manuscript in which the village curate denounces organised religion as "but a castle in the air" and theology as "but ignorance of natural causes reduced to a system".

Thought

In his Testament, Meslier repudiated not only the God of conventional Christianity, but even the generic God of the natural religion of the deists. For Meslier, the existence of evil was incompatible with the idea of a good and wise God. He denied that any spiritual value could be gained from suffering, and he used the deist's argument from design against god, by showing the evils that he had permitted in this world. To him, religions were fabrications fostered by ruling elites; although the earliest Christians had been exemplary in sharing their goods, Christianity had long since degenerated into encouraging the acceptance of suffering and submission to tyranny as practised by the kings of France: injustice was explained away as being the will of an all-wise Being. None of the arguments used by Meslier against the existence of God were original. In fact, he derived them from books written by orthodox theologians in the debate between the Jesuits, Cartesians, and Jansenists. Their inability to agree on a proof for God's existence was taken by Meslier as a good reason not to presume that there were compelling grounds for belief in God.

Meslier's philosophy was that of an atheist. He also denied the existence of the soul and dismissed the notion of free will. In Chapter V, the priest writes, "If God is incomprehensible to man, it would seem rational never to think of Him at all". Meslier later describes God as "a chimera" and argues that the supposition of God is not prerequisite to morality. In fact, he concludes that "Whether there exists a God or not [...] men's moral duties will always be the same so long as they possess their own nature".

In chapters XXXIII and XXXIV, Meslier challenged Jesus' mental health by implying that Jesus "was really a madman, a fanatic" (étoit véritablement un fou, un insensé, un fanatique).

In his most famous quote, Meslier refers to a man who "wished that all the great men in the world and all the nobility could be hanged, and strangled with the guts of the priests." Meslier admits that the statement may seem crude and shocking, but comments that this is what the priests and nobility deserve, not for reasons of revenge or hatred, but for love of justice and truth.

Equally well-known is the version by Diderot: "And [with] the guts of the last priest let's strangle the neck of the last king." During the political unrest of May 1968, the radical students of the Sorbonne Occupation Committee paraphrased Meslier's epigram, stating that "humanity won’t be happy till the last capitalist is hung with the guts of the last bureaucrat."

Meslier also vehemently attacked social injustice and sketched out a kind of rural proto-communism. All the people in a region would belong to a commune in which wealth would be held in common, and everybody would work. Founded on love and brotherhood, the communes would ally to help each other and preserve peace.

An opponent of cruelty to animals, Meslier wrote that "it is an act of cruelty, of barbarism, to kill, to strike unconscious, and to cut the throat of animals, who do no harm to anyone, the way we do." He considered the lack of compassion and concern by Christians for animal suffering at the hands of man to be, according to Matthieu Ricard, further proof of "the nonexistence, or the malice, of their God."

Voltaire's Extrait
Various edited abstracts (known as "extraits") of the Testament were printed and circulated, condensing the multi-volume original manuscript and sometimes adding material that was not written by Meslier. Abstracts were popular because of the length and convoluted style of the original.

Voltaire often mentions Meslier (referring to him as "a good priest") in his correspondence, in which he tells his daughter to "read and read again" Meslier's only work, and says that "every honest man should have Meslier's Testament in his pocket." However, he also described Meslier as writing "in the style of a carriage-horse".

Voltaire published his own expurgated version as Extraits des sentiments de Jean Meslier (first edition, 1762). Voltaire's edition changed the thrust of Meslier's arguments (or drew on other Extraits which did this) so that he appeared to be a deist—like Voltaire—rather than an atheist.

The following passage is found at the end of Voltaire's Extrait, and has been cited in support of the view that Meslier was not really an atheist. However, the passage does not appear in either the 1864 complete edition of the Testament, published in Amsterdam by Rudolf Charles, or in the complete works of Meslier published 1970–1972.

Another book, Good Sense, published anonymously in 1772, was long attributed to Meslier, but was in fact written by Baron d'Holbach.

The complete Testament of Meslier was published in English translation (by Michael Shreve) for the first time in 2009.

Legacy
In his book In Defense of Atheism (2007) the atheist philosopher Michel Onfray describes Meslier as the first person to write an entire text in support of atheism:

Prior to announcing Meslier as the first atheist philosopher, Onfray considers and dismisses Cristóvão Ferreira, a Portuguese and former Jesuit who renounced his faith under Japanese torture in 1633 and went on to write a book titled The Deception Revealed. However, Onfray decides that Ferreira was not such a good candidate as Meslier, since Ferreira converted to Zen Buddhism.

The Situationist cultural theorist Raoul Vaneigem praised Meslier's resistance to hierarchical authority, claiming that "the last full-fledged exemplars of priests genuinely loyal to the revolutionary origins of their religion were Jean Meslier and Jacques Roux fomenting jacquerie and riot".

According to Colin Brewer (2007), who co-produced a play about Meslier's life,

Historians argue about who was the first overt, post-Classical atheist but Meslier was arguably the first to put his name to an incontrovertibly atheist document. That this important event is largely unrecognised (Meslier was absent from both Richard Dawkins’ and Jonathan Miller's recent TV series on atheism) is due partly to Voltaire who published, in 1761, a grossly distorted "Extract" that portrayed Meslier as a fellow-deist and entirely suppressed Meslier's anti-monarchist, proto-communist opinions.

Bibliography
Meslier, Jean (2009). Testament: Memoir of the Thoughts and Sentiments of Jean Meslier. Translated by Michael Shreve. Prometheus Books. .

References

Further reading
 Benitez, Miguel (2012). Les yeux de la raison: le matérialisme athée de Jean Meslier.  Paris: Champion.
 Bredel, Marc (1983). Jean Meslier L'enragé: prêtre athée et révolutionnaire sous Louis XIV.  Paris: Baland.
 Brewer, Colin (2007). "Thinker: Jean Meslier", New Humanist. Vol. 122 (4), July/August. Available online: Thinker: Jean Meslier.
 Deprun, Jean; Desné, Roland; Soboul, Albert (1970–72). Jean Meslier. Oeuvres complètes.  Vols. 1–3. Paris: Editions Anthropos.
 Dommanget, Maurice (2008). Le curé Meslier : athée, communiste & révolutionnaire sous Louis XIV.  Paris: Coda: Institut français d'histoire sociale.
 Morehouse, Andrew R. (1936). Voltaire and Jean Meslier. Yale Romanic Studies, IX. New Haven: Yale University Press.
 Wade, Ira O. (1933). "The Manuscripts of Jean Meslier's "Testament" and Voltaire's Printed "Extrait" ", Modern Philology, Vol. 30 (4), May, pp. 381–98 The Manuscripts of Jean Meslier's "Testament" and Voltaire's Printed "Extrait".

External links
 
 
 
 
 Superstition In All Ages, Common Sense 1732 English 
 Le bon sens du curé J. Meslier, suivi de son testament published 1830 includes correspondence of Voltaire on Meslier's testament, a biography of Meslier by Voltaire, Le bon sens, by d'Holbach, and the Extrait of the Testament produced by Voltaire.
 1864 complete edition Volume 1, Volume 2 and Volume 3
 A translation of Voltaire's abridged "Testament".
 Jean Meslier and "The Gentle Inclination of Nature" by Michel Onfray translated by Marvin Mandell
 The Poisoned Will of Jean Meslier. History Today. 10 October 2017.
 Archive of Jean Meslier Papers at the International Institute of Social History

1664 births
1729 deaths
17th-century atheists
17th-century French Roman Catholic priests
18th-century atheists
18th-century French Roman Catholic priests
18th-century French male writers
Atheist philosophers
Critics of religions
French atheist writers
French communists
French male writers
French materialists
French philosophers
People from Ardennes (department)